Peter Wilhelm Danckert (8 July 1940 – 3 November 2022) was a German politician and member of the SPD. He was born in Berlin, Brandenburg, Prussia, Germany, and was a member of the Bundestag from 1998 to 2013.

References

External links 
 
 Biography from German Bundestag

1940 births
2022 deaths
Social Democratic Party of Germany politicians
Politicians from Berlin
German Protestants
Members of the Bundestag for Brandenburg
Members of the Bundestag 2009–2013
Members of the Bundestag 2005–2009
Members of the Bundestag 2002–2005
Members of the Bundestag 1998–2002
Members of the Bundestag for the Social Democratic Party of Germany